Ming Yuzhen (2 October 1328 – 17 March 1366) was a peasant rebel leader who established the dynasty of Ming Xia during the late Yuan dynasty in China.

The Ming Xia was destroyed by Zhu Yuanzhang, and Ming Yuzhen's son Ming Sheng was exiled to Korea.

Background 
Ming was born in Suizhou (today Sui County, Hubei) in a farmer family. He changed the character of his surname to mean "Brilliance" later.  In 1353 he joined the Red Turbans and was blinded in the right eye during a battle.

In 1360, Ming left his group and proclaimed himself King of Longshu (隴蜀王). Two years later, he proclaimed himself Emperor of Great Xia in Chongqing, with the era name of "Tiantong" (天統). In the Great Xia, he taxed the people, administered imperial examinations, and the state religion was Buddhism.

In 1363, Ming Yuzhen attacked Prince Liang, Basalawarmi, Bolud Temür (孛羅帖木兒) in Yunnan, but he failed. Ming died of illness at the age of 35. He was succeeded by his son Ming Sheng (明昇), who changed the era name to "Kaixi" (開熙).

However Ming Sheng was exiled to Korea when Longshu was destroyed by Zhu Yuanzhang in 1371. The Korean official Yun Hui-chong's daughter married Ming Sheng in March 1373. Ming Sheng was 17 and Chen Li was 21 when they were sent to Korea in 1372 by Zhu Yuanzhang.

Also, Ming Yuzhen is the founder of the following Korean clans: the Yeonan Myeong clan, Seochok Myeong clan and Namwon Seung clan.

References 

Red Turban rebels
Yuan dynasty people
1331 births
1366 deaths
Yeonan Myeong clan
Seochok Myeong clan
Founding monarchs